"Burning Heat" is the theme song of the first stage of the arcade shooter game Gradius II, composed by Konami Kukeiha Club.

Usage 
 Gradius II
 Gradius III - Stage 3 Hidden song
 Gokujō Parodius! ～Kako no Eikō o Motomete～ - Special stage song
 Beatmania
 Dance Dance Revolution
 Mega Force 2(Korean Doujin soft) - Stage 1 song
 85Doeotsuda!(Korean Doujin soft) - Stage 1 song

External links 
 Nintendo Music - G-R - VGMusic. Gradius 2 - Stage 1.
 Beatmania IIDX 7th Style - Burning Heat! (Full Option Mix)

References 

Gradius
Video game theme songs
Year of song missing